Switzerland (named after the European country of the same name) is an open-source network monitoring utility developed and released by the Electronic Frontier Foundation (EFF). Its goal is to monitor network traffic between two systems running the program to see if the user's Internet service provider is violating network neutrality, like Comcast did in 2007 with the BitTorrent protocol.

Switzerland was featured in the Technology section of an issue of New Scientist in August 2008.

See also

 HTTPS Everywhere – also made by the EFF
 Privacy Badger – also made by the EFF

References

External links
 

Beta software
Free network-related software
Net neutrality
Electronic Frontier Foundation